The DC Universe is the fictional universe that serves as a setting for DC Comics stories, for most of the interlinked mainstream DC comics.

DC Universe may also refer to:

DC Universe (franchise) (DCU; 2025–present), a shared universe of superhero films and TV series developed by DC Studios
DC Universe (streaming service), a streaming service featuring exclusive television series based on DC Comics
DC Universe (toyline), a range of toys based on DC Comics characters
DC Universe Classics, a sub-line of the DC Universe toys
DC Universe (themed area), multiple themed lands at Six Flags amusement parks
Multiverse (DC Comics), the collection of most of the fictional universes established by DC Comics
DC Animated Universe (DCAU; est. 1992), a fictional universe, the setting for several of the animated series based on DC Comics
DC Animated Movie Universe (DCMAU; 2013–2020), a fictional universe, the setting for several of the animated movies based on DC Comics
DC Universe Online, a video game based on the main DC Universe
DC Universe Animated Original Movies, direct-to-video animated films
DC Universe Roleplaying Game, a role-playing game released in 1999
DC Universe, a number of DC Comics comic books:
DC Universe #0, a 2008 one-shot that acted as a prologue for Final Crisis
 DC Universe: Decisions, a 2008–2009 limited series
 DC Universe Holiday Bash, three end-of-year specials published between 1996 and 1998
 DC Universe: Last Will & Testament, a 2008 one-shot
 DC Universe: Legacies, a 10-issue limited series
 DC Universe Online: Legends, a 26-issue dual-weekly limited series, based on the DC Universe Online game
 DC Extended Universe (DCEU; 2013–2023), a series of superhero films and television series based on DC Comics characters

See also
List of DC Multiverse worlds